Sao Chingcha is one of the twelve khwaeng (subdistricts) of Phra Nakhon District, Bangkok.

History
Its name after "Sao Chingcha" or internationally known as "Giant Swing", a towering structure in Hinduism. It was built in the early Rattanakosin era, after the establishment of Bangkok as the new capital by King Rama I, only two years. Sao Chingcha  was created to perform a Hindu ritual known as "Triyampawai", believed to welcome Mahesh (Shiva) and Narayana (Vishnu) to visit the human world.

After the Siamese revolution in 1932, this ritual were reduced in importance, which was held for the last time in 1934 during King Rama VII's reign. However, Sao Chingcha still stands in the same place and has been renovated many times. It was listed as a registered national ancient monument by Fine Arts Department in 1949.

Currently, Sao Chingcha is well-known in one of Bangkok's symbols and landmarks.

The area around Sao Chingcha was formerly a community and market in the name of "Talat Sao Chingcha". In 1972 after amalgamating theactivities of the Metropolis of Krung Thep (Phra Nakhon) and Thon Buri, The Krung Thep and Thon Buri Provincial Administrations, the Metropolitan City Municipality and Sanitation Administration into the "Bangkok Metropolitan Administration" (BMA), Bangkok City Hall therefore was built on the site of Talat Sao Chingcha. It was designed by a Thai architect Prince  Samaichalerm Kridakorn. Traders of Talat Sao Chingcha has to move to a new location, which is the nearby Talat Trok Mo in present day.

Geography
Sao Chingcha is considered to be an area in the inner city of Bangkok or Rattanakosin Island.

It is bordered by neighbouring subdistricts (from the north clockwise): Bowon Niwet (Khlong Lot Wat Ratchanadda is a divider line), Samran Rat (Siriphong Road is a divider line), Wat Ratchabophit (Bamrung Mueang Road is a divider line), San Chao Pho Suea (Tanao Road is a divider line), respectively. All in its district.

A world-class tourist attraction Wat Suthat, indeed, it is located in the area of Wat Ratchabophit.

Places
Giant Swing
Devasathan
Bangkok City Hall and Townspeople Ground
Wat Mahannapharam

References

Phra Nakhon district
Subdistricts of Bangkok